is a city located in Kagoshima Prefecture, Japan.  It is on the western (East China Sea) side of the Satsuma Peninsula.

As of May 31, 2011, population data, the city has an estimated population of 39,012 with 18,711 households and a population density of 137.71 persons per km². The total area is 283.30 km².

The modern city of Minamisatsuma was established on November 7, 2005, from the merger of the old city of Kaseda, with the town of Kinpō (from Hioki District), and the towns of Bonotsu, Kasasa and Ōura (all from Kawanabe District).

Previous mergers (as listed in the Kawanabe District, Kagoshima Wikipedia article included:
  July 15, 1954 - The towns of Kaseda and Bansei were merged to create the city of Kaseda. (3 towns, 3 villages)
  January 1, 1925 The village of Higashikaseda was elevated to town status and renamed to become the town of Bansei. (4 towns, 4 villages)
  January 1, 1924 - The village of Kaseda was elevated to town status to become the town of Kaseda.(3 towns, 5 villages)
  April 1, 1889 - Due to the municipal status enforcement, the villages of Kaseda, Nishikaseda, Higashikaseda, Higashinanpo, Nishinanpo, Katsume and Kawanabe were formed in Kawanabe District. (7 villages)

Bansei Tokkō Peace Museum is located in the Kawanabe District of this city.

Geography

Climate
Minamisatsuma has a humid subtropical climate (Köppen climate classification Cfa) with hot summers and mild winters. Precipitation is significant throughout the year, and is heavier in summer, especially the months of June and July.

Demographics
Per Japanese census data, the population of Minamisatsuma in 2020 is 32,887 people. Minamisatsuma has been conducting censuses since 1920. The city's population peaked in 1945 at more than 90,000 people; the city's population has steadily declined since then. Until 2020, the city's population is still showing no signs of picking up.

List of mergers in Minamisatsuma

Kaseda 
Kaseda (加世田市; -shi) was a city located in Kagoshima Prefecture, Japan. The city was founded on July 15, 1954. As of 2003, the city had an estimated population of 23,740 and the density of 251.56 persons per km². The total area was 94.37 km². On November 7, 2005, Bōnotsu, was merged to create Minamisatsuma and no longer exists as an independent municipality.

Kinpō
 was a town located in Hioki District, Kagoshima Prefecture, Japan. As of 2003, the town had an estimated population of 8,099 and the density of 112.10 persons per km². The total area was 72.25 km². On November 7, 2005, Kinpō, was merged to create Minamisatsuma and no longer exists as an independent municipality.

Bonotsu
 was a town located in Kawanabe District, Kagoshima Prefecture, Japan. As of 2003, the town had an estimated population of 4,387 and the density of 113.62 persons per km². The total area was 38.61 km². On November 7, 2005, Bōnotsu, was merged to create Minamisatsuma and no longer exists as an independent municipality.

Kasasa
 was a town located in Kawanabe District, Kagoshima Prefecture, Japan. As of 2003, the town had an estimated population of 3,585 and the density of 89.89 persons per km². The total area was 39.88 km². On November 7, 2005, Bōnotsu, was merged to create Minamisatsuma and no longer exists as an independent municipality.

Ōura
 was a town located in Kawanabe District, Kagoshima Prefecture, Japan. As of 2003, the town had an estimated population of 2,802 and the density of 73.37 persons per km². The total area was 38.19 km². On November 7, 2005, Bōnotsu, was merged to create Minamisatsuma and no longer exists as an independent municipality.

References

External links
 Minamisatsuma City official website 

Cities in Kagoshima Prefecture
Minamisatsuma, Kagoshima